Lisa Raymond was the defending champion, but lost in the final to Vera Zvonareva. The score was 4–6, 6–4, 7–5.

Seeds
The first two seeds received a bye into the second round.

Draw

Finals

Top half

Bottom half

References
 Official results archive (ITF)
 Official results archive (WTA)

Singles
2004 WTA Tour